The Savaji family (also spelled Savji) was an Iranian family native to Persian Iraq, who served the Turkmen Aq Qoyunlu and then later the Safavid dynasty.

References

Sources 
 
 
 

Families of Safavid Iran
Families of the Aq Qoyunlu